Fire and Ice is a contemporary Christian music album by Steve Camp and was released by Sparrow Records in late 1983. This was Camp's first studio album since switching from Word earlier that year (though his final Word album, It's a Dying World, had already been recorded and would eventually be released in 1984). CCM Magazine has ranked Fire and Ice at number 96 in their 2001 book The 100 Greatest Albums in Christian Music.The album peaked at number 14 on the Billboard Top Inspirational Albums chart.

Track listing 
All songs written by Steve Camp, except where noted.

"Upon This Rock" (Steve Camp, Rob Frazier) – 3:37
"It Is Good" (Camp, Frazier, John Rosasco) – 3:37
"Love's Not a Feeling" (duet with Michele Pillar)  (Camp, Frazier) – 4:17
"Heart of Stone" (Camp, Frazier) – 4:10
"Living in Laodicea" – 4:04
"Squeeze" (Camp, Frazier) – 4:57
"Fire and Ice" (Camp, Frazier) – 2:55
"Light Your Candle" – 3:48
"What Would the Devil Say?" (Camp, Frazier) – 2:59
"Where Are the Heroes" – 4:52

Personnel 

 Steve Camp – lead and backing vocals, keyboards 
 Smitty Price – keyboards
 John Rosasco – keyboards
 Rhett Lawrence – synthesizer programming
 Dann Huff – guitars
 Marty Walsh – guitars
 Gary Lunn – bass
 John Patitucci – bass
 Keith Edwards – drums
 Joe English – drums, backing vocals 
 Alex MacDougal – percussion 
 Brandon Fields – saxophone 
 Joan Anderson – backing vocals
 Carol Frazier – backing vocals
 Rob Frazier – backing vocals
 Howard McCrary – backing vocals
 Linda McCrary – backing vocals
 Charity McCrary – backing vocals
 Diane Thiel – backing vocals
 Kevin Thiel – backing vocals
 Michele Pillar – lead vocals (3)

Production

 Steve Camp – producer, arranger
 John Rosasco – producer, arranger
 Steve Wyer – executive producer
 Wally Grant – engineer
 Greg Butler – assistant engineer
 Mike Ross – assistant engineer
 Brent Maher – additional engineer
 Hank Neuberger – additional engineer 
 Weddington Studios, North Hollywood, California – recording location
 Steve Hall – mastering at Future Disc, Hollywood, California
 Stan Evenson – art direction for Stan Evenson Design, Inc.
 B. Charlyne Hinesley – cover coordination
 Marlene Bergmann – design
 John Taylor – design
 Craig Barnes – photography

Notes

The song, "Light Your Candle", was recorded for with Camp's 1984 album, It's a Dying World, which was recorded before Fire and Ice, but released after. For this album, Camp added the line "Let it burn bright in the face of the devil" in the chorus.

Charts

Radio singles

References 

1983 albums
Steve Camp albums
Sparrow Records albums